Ilmar is an Estonian masculine given name and may refer to:
Ilmar Aluvee (1969–2013), Estonian skier
Ilmar Kullam (1922–2011), Estonian basketball player and Olympic athlete
Ilmar Laaban (1921–2000), Estonian poet and publicist
Ilmar Ojase (born 1973), Estonian swimmer 
Ilmar Öpik (1917–2001), Estonian energetics scientist and academician
Ilmar Raag (born 1968), Estonian media executive, screenwriter and film director
Ilmar Raud (1913–1941), Estonian chess master
Ilmar Reepalu (born 1943), Estonian-born Swedish politician
Ilmar Sikemäe (1914–1998), Estonian writer
Ilmar Tamm (born 1972), Estonian Brigadier General
Ilmar Taska (born 1953), Estonian filmmaker and writer

Cognates
Ilmari, a similar, Finnish masculine given name
Ilmārs, a similar, Latvian masculine given name

References

Estonian masculine given names